The  is a river in Japan which flows through Gifu Prefecture, and is part of the Kiso River system.

Geography
The river originates on Mount Nōgōhaku, which lies on the border of Gifu and Fukui prefectures. After starting in Motosu, the river flows into Ibigawa, where it merges with the Ibi River.

River communities
The river passes through or forms the boundary of Motosu, Ibigawa, Ōno, and Hozumi, all in Gifu Prefecture.

References

Rivers of Gifu Prefecture
Rivers of Japan